Kern's Fort, also known as Michael Kern's Cabin, is a historic home located at Morgantown, Monongalia County, West Virginia. It is a one-story log house built in 1772. It is built of chestnut logs and covered with wood clapboards. Attached to the rear is a 19th-century frame addition.  It was built by Michael Kern, perhaps, the first permanent settler of what is now Morgantown.  When Lord Dunmore's War started in 1774, Kern built a stockaded fort around his cabin.

It was listed on the National Register of Historic Places in 1993. It is located in the Greenmont Historic District, listed in 2005.

References

Houses on the National Register of Historic Places in West Virginia
Colonial architecture in West Virginia
Houses completed in 1772
Houses in Morgantown, West Virginia
National Register of Historic Places in Monongalia County, West Virginia
Log buildings and structures on the National Register of Historic Places in West Virginia